Axis Direct is the flagship brand under Axis Securities Limited, a subsidiary of Axis Bank in India. Providing Demat and Trading services. Its main offices are in Mumbai. The company employs over 2,100 people.

History
In 2010, Axis Sales Limited acquired approvals/registrations from the regulatory authorities for brokering business on stock exchanges. With the inclusion of retail brokering, the company was renamed Axis Securities and Sales Limited and its brokering business was branded Axis Direct in January 2011.
The company is the online brand of Axis Securities,a wholly owned subsidiary of Axis Bank.

Products and services
Axis Direct provides a 3-in-1 Online Investment Account which is a combination of Axis Bank Savings along with an Axis Direct trading and Demat account services:

 Equities – Invest online in stocks of listed companies
 Mutual Funds – Invest in mutual funds including equity, hybrid, tax saving or debt schemes from asset management companies
 SIPs – Systematic investment plan that allows automated investments
 IPOs - Invest in initial public offerings (IPO)
 Derivatives – Hedge or speculate on the price movement of stocks or index through its derivative products viz. Futures and Options
 Bonds, NCDs & Corporate FDs – Invest in fixed income instruments such as bonds, NCDs and Corporate FDs
 ETFs - Invest in exchange-traded funds
 Value Added Services - Provides investing and trading ideas, along with financial tools and calculators, tax solutions, will planning and robot advisors.
 MCX - Invest in bullion, metals, energy and agricultural commodities
 NCDEX - Benefit from the bank's membership in NCDEX to invest in agriculture and non-agriculture commodities business, especially from semi-urban and rural India
 Equity smallcases - Invest in a curated basket of stocks based on a theme or market trend.

The company had launched an online platform to buy and sell bonds and debentures in the secondary market called "YIELD" in March 2021.

Mobile app
The Mobile App allows customers buy and sell, watch their portfolio, track live markets and trade on the go. Mobile voice-based trading, the first in India to provide a touch-free stock trading experience.

References

External links
 Official Website

Financial services companies of India
Indian companies established in 2011
Financial services companies based in Mumbai
Brokerage firms
Axis Bank
2011 establishments in Maharashtra
Financial services companies established in 2011